Might and Magic III: Isles of Terra is the third game in the role-playing video game series Might and Magic. Released in 1991, it is the predecessor to Might and Magic IV: Clouds of Xeen and the sequel to Might and Magic II: Gates to Another World. A Sega Genesis version was developed, but never released.

Plot
After the defeat of Sheltem and his forces on CRON in Might and Magic II: Gates to Another World, a new party of adventurers from Sheltem's "homeworld" of Terra find themselves embroiled in the battle between the two Guardians. The adventurers must aid the mysterious Corak in attempting to stop Sheltem once again and putting an end to his evil machinations. In canon, these adventurers are named Sir Caneghem, Crag Hack, Maximus, Resurrectra, Dark Shade, Kastore, Robert the Wise and Tolberti.

Throughout the game, the adventurers travel the Isles of Terra, a grouping of separate, flat "nacelle" worlds drawn from the Void onto the oceanic planet of Terra by Sheltem himself in previous years. Driven against the Ancients, Sheltem is now launching their nacelles into the suns of various worlds, snuffing out countless lives in his wake.
Driven by the tales told in Corak's journals regarding the Ancients, the Elemental Lords and the "Forces of the Dome", the heroes pursue the Guardians, battling terrors along the way.

Finally, the heroes enter the so-called "Maze from Hell" and earn the title of "Ultimate Adventurers" from the maze's defenses. Uncovering revelations about Terra's past, they gain access to the Pyramids of the Ancients, stumbling upon what is named a 'Main Control Center'. They find themselves within the underwater seedship originally used by the Ancients in centuries past to colonize Terra with human life before its submersion beneath the waves.

At the game's conclusion, Sheltem pilots an escape pod within the underwater ship and sets off for the nacelle of Xeen, with Corak in close pursuit. After departing, Corak hastily contacts the adventurers from his escape pod, instructing them in the means of matter transferral to land the seedship - named the "Lincoln" - safely. They set off to pursue Corak and Sheltem in the Lincoln, and it is implied that they actually do so in Might and Magic IV: Clouds of Xeen. However, they did in fact drift off-course and are next seen as powerful non-player characters in Might and Magic VII: For Blood and Honor.

Gameplay
Might and Magic III employs an updated first person perspective interface based on the one employed by Might and Magic Book One: The Secret of the Inner Sanctum and Might and Magic II: Gates to Another World. The action is turn based throughout the game phases. A number of improvements, made possible by an expanded development team and advancements in computer technology, are incorporated. The graphics are more colourful, taking advantage of contemporary VGA displays. A number of sound cards are supported, offering improved sound effects, background music, and synthesized speech. Mouse interaction is also supported for the first time.

Textual character summaries in the lower portion of the screen are replaced with a graphical head-up display, featuring the faces of the player characters, which wear different expressions depending on the condition of the character. Spells are selected from a list: an improvement on previous games where they had to be specified using numeric codes. Level maps were no longer limited to a 16 x 16 grid, and an automapping function eliminated the need for drawing maps on paper. Also, enemy creatures can now be seen as they approach, or are approached, from distant squares. In previous games the enemy creatures were only detected when they were in the same square as the player characters, which made combat more difficult to avoid. The ability to shoot at a distance also gives ranged weapons a more distinct tactical advantage. At the end of combat, players do not have to "search" for loot as in previous games.

The player can save the game state at almost any time, with the notable exceptions of the Arena and Castle Greywind Dungeon, at which the player cannot store game state. In previous games, saving was accomplished by visiting an inn and signing the registry. Saving the game also records that enemy creatures have been killed; in previous games traveling to a level from an inn fully populates the former with monsters every time.

Reception

Computer Gaming Worlds Johnny L. Wilson in 1991 stated that the game would appeal to both new and experienced Might & Magic players. Charles Ardai reviewed the game for Computer Gaming World, and stated that "Might and Magic III: Isles of Terra is a stunning new implementation of venerable concepts that should please the majority of its intended audience." In 1992 the magazine named it as one of the year's best role-playing games, citing "its new graphic look, use of sound and challenging play". The magazine's Scorpia was also positive, writing in 1993 that Might & Magic III was "a big improvement in the series, and worth playing". The game was reviewed in 1992 in Dragon #177 by Hartley, Patricia, and Kirk Lesser in "The Role of Computers" column.

Reviewing the SNES version, Mike Weigand of Electronic Gaming Monthly said it was "a decent RPG with ... a solid story line and excellent music, but the interface is poor. Although the scrolling is true to PC, the step-by-step frame can get to you after a while."

In 1994, PC Gamer US named Might & Magic III as the 25th best computer game ever. The editors called it "one of role-playing's most engrossing adventures."

Notes

References

External links

1991 video games
Role-playing video games
Amiga games
DOS games
FM Towns games
Cancelled Sega Genesis games
Classic Mac OS games
Might and Magic
NEC PC-9801 games
New World Computing games
Sega CD games
Super Nintendo Entertainment System games
TurboGrafx-CD games
U.S. Gold games
Video games scored by George Sanger
Video games featuring protagonists of selectable gender
Video game sequels
Games commercially released with DOSBox
Science fantasy video games
First-person party-based dungeon crawler video games
Video games developed in the United States
Single-player video games